Brachiopterna is a genus of tephritid  or fruit flies in the family Tephritidae. Named after the Hungarian zoologist, Kalman Kittenberger's pseudonym, Katona.

Species
Brachiopterna katonae Bezzi, 1924
Brachiopterna ornithomorpha (Munro, 1931)

References

Tephritinae
Tephritidae genera